The 1954–55 Cypriot First Division was the 18th season of the Cypriot top-level football league.

Overview
It was contested by 10 teams, and AEL Limassol won the championship.

League standings

Results

References
Cyprus - List of final tables (RSSSF)

Cypriot First Division seasons
Cypriot First Division, 1954-55
1